Nepal Student Union ( NSU) is one of the major student political wings in Nepal. The Nepal Student Union represents the Nepali Congress, currently the ruling party of Nepal. During the autocratic King's rule (Panchayati Byawastha), the union played a major role in unifying students to overthrow King's direct rule and establish democracy in the country.

History
The organization was formed during autocratic Panchayat era. It was formed in March 1970 in Swyambhu, Kathmandu by Bipin Koirala, Marshall Julum Shakya and current politicians Arjun Narasingha K.C. and Sher Bahadur Deuba.

The first major student movement was held in 1979 for the sake of Free Student Union and for the restoration of Democracy in Nepal. 
The first president of Nepal student union was Bipin Koirala in 1970. In the year 1971, Sher Bahadur Deuba became the second president of the Nepal student union.

JAY NEPAL 

The Jayatu Sanskritam dissent was considered the most significant and the first student dissents of Nepal. The students from Rajakiya Sanskrit Vidyalaya agitated against the policy of contemporary government. The role of the students was to create awareness among the people and to spread political consciousness as the beginning of democracy.

The leaders of Jayatu Sanskritam included: 
 Ram Prasad Neupane (from Ramechhap)
 Kashinath Gautam
 Sribhadra Sharma Khanal (from Tanahun)
 Parasuram Pokhrel
 Purna Prasad Brahman
 Kamal Raj Regmi
 Rajeshwor Devkota
 Gokarna Shastri
 Rajesh Sahani (From Kapilvastu 8 )
 Nageshwar Nagbansi ( From kapilvastu 7 )
 Anil Gaud

The development process of student union
The history of the developing process of student union suggests us that students have been presenting their persuasive nature since 2006. In India, Mahatma Gandhi was agitating against the English government school. B.P. Koirala in his very young age of 11 years was also involved in the movement under the leadership of Mahatma Gandhi.

In the age of 15, B.P. Koirala was confined because he was fighting for the emancipation of Nepali people from Rana Rein. He was the President of Congress Socialist Party of boys section. And Ganesh Man Singh was expelled from Durbar High School; Krishna Prasad Bhattarai was the Vice President of “Nepal Chatra Sangh“, the union of Nepali Students in Banarash.

Students were the representatives who exploded the revolution against the tyrannical system of Rana rein. In that context, in BS 1997, magh 16, the student leader of Tri-Chandra College, Ganga Lal Shrestha was killed by hanging on a tree in Shova Bhagawati. So, he is called first martyr of the student union.

The Establishment of Nepal Pupil Union (Nepal Chhatra Sangh)
The ebb and flow of freedom in India had its influence on democracy in Nepal. As a result, the heart of puppet government of Ranas’ started trembling. In spite of the excessive suppression by Rana, a few energetic youths gathered in Kupondole and organized a debating club under the chairperson-ship of Ganesh Bahadur Gurung and the other members of that committee were Basu Rimal, Surendra Raj Sharma, Gobind Lohani, Mrigendra Raj Pandey, Tej Bahadur prasai, Puskarnath Upadhaya, Krishna Babu etc. All the students were being prepared to rebel against the Rana Rein. And the debating club after while changed into Nepal Pupil Union during 2025 BS

Nepal National Students Federation
Nepal N.S.P. is one of the students unions of Nepal established before 2007, Fagun, 7. Later the students who believed on leftist ideology had felt another student association as a result Nepal National Student Federation was born. It became active against the Rana rein.

Nepal Youth Party (Nepal Tarun Dal)
Nepal Youth party was established as a socialist party on 10th Kartik 2010 B.S. The purpose of union or party was to aware the pessimist youths living in different parts of Nepal. The union got the unexpected support and belief from the energetic and politically conscious youths of the then period. The slogan was recited by the youths “Samajbad Jindabad” which was skyscraping all over the country. As a result, in many parts of country the branches of this organization began to be organized. It created a kind of optimism over the youths.

The Dissent of Free Student Union
On the Ist poush, 2017 military event binod jayswal  had totally obstructed the all parties except the student unions. The students leaders of Nepal Pupil Union (Nepali Congress Supporters) and Nepal Youth Party were constrained which badly affected the leaders and cadres of other student unions negatively as a result the students of other parties became passive. Nepal National Student Federation and other leftist student union had been already involved in Panchyati System. Nepal Sanskrit Student Union also became passive and less meaningful. In the initial period of panchayati system, the people could not raise their voice against the Panchyati Suppression and it had declared the total prohibition over the all student union. In 2017, the students were agitating the movement of King Mahendra. The student leaders were Binod jayswal, Marshal Julum Shakya and so on.

Nepal Pupil and Youth Organization
The joint organization between Nepal pupil and youth union had a significant role as it was managed by the migrated Nepali Students in Darbhanga India. They were trying to collect India's support to establish democracy in Nepal. The leaders of the Union were C.K. Prasai, President, Maheshwor Singh, the General Secretary and others are Shiva Chand Jha, Arbinda Thakur and so on.

Assembly of Intra High School
In spite of the excessive obstruction by the Panchayati government, the rebellious students had never left their ethics of revolution. The political parties in which ethics and belief, the students were concerned, were directly or indirectly opposing the Panchayati tyrants. Although the great suppression of that system had badly affected the students movement but the students were never tired agitating them. Even the students of high school level were encouraged to have been participated in the movement of anti-Panchayati system. During the course of this movement, students had taken a risk and they organized an assembly of 22 high school's student in 2019 to aware the people about democracy. The students of college or campus were also agitating the Panchayati government. The assembly is still regarded as one of the historical movement in the entire history of Nepalese politics.

The Protest of University Students
After having the right to organize the union, the first student's Protest was held on 22 Baisakh, 2020. On Baisakh 19, 2020 the then principal of university Surya Bahadur Sakya had punished the students Dambar Biru, the student of English department TU and Shree Bhakta Gobinda Shrestha as a result, the students agitated against his punishment. In the process of that Protest, an action committee was formed under the chairmanship of Nava Raj Subedi.

Intra College Students Assembly
Before 2007 B.S., there was only one college in Nepal which was Tri-Chandra College. In Tri-Chandra College only the arts education was available - those students who were interested to study science in further level had to go to India. After 2007 BS, or after the democracy, there was a mushroom growth of school in Nepal. As a result, average people could get education in Nepal relatively easily. Till the military evidence there were 29 colleges in Nepal, there was not the favorable environment for the uplifting of university education.

There was lack of furniture, infrastructure, and other facilities although Tribhuvan University had already been established. The first vice chancellor Mr. Subarna Samser Rana had formed the educational activities dynamically to uplift the educational qualities. He had also developed the technical and physical aspect of Tribhuvan University. Due to the military evidence of 2017, the educational activities were obstructed. The students hardly succeeded to organize the student unions to solve the class problems. The students were deprived of organizing the student unions till 2019.

In spite of many challenges and obstacles the students were able to form the union in 2019 B.S. The first president of the Student Union was Nawaraj Subedi. Subedi not only did works against the students' sprit but also showed his moral support to the Panchayati government. As a result, students got him to quit from the committee and selected Daman Nath Dhungana as an acting president.

The election of Tribhuvan University had organized the second union. There are so many unions among the inter colleges of TU in Nepal. The student organizations of intra valley college had decided to have assembly from 25 to 29 Baisakh 2021. The students of Tri-Chandra College had hung the banners at the fence of Rani Pokhari in which ‘Intra College Assembly‘ was written. The assembly was held in Trichandra college at Saraswati Sadan. It was a symbol of students' courage to appear before the tyrannical government.

The Preparation of First General Assembly
There was no change in the exploiting nature of Panchyati tyrannical government over the democratic forces. The students were going to be more energetic and rebellious against it. The government was being fully restless. The victory of the democratic candidates on the election of union in Tribhuvan University was considered as the first attempt of democracy.

Leadership

Past Presidents and General Secretaries 
    
Bipin Koirala-founding President         
Tika Pokharel- founding General secretary
Sher Bahadur Deuba -President            
Ram Saran Mahat- General secretary
Bimalendra Nidhi- President                  
Dil Bahadur Gharti - General secretary 
Bal Bahadur K.C.- President              
Prakash Saran Mahat -General secretary
Gyanendra Bahadur Karki-President
Baal Krishna Khand -President     
Nabindra Raj Joshi- general secretary                             
N.P. Saud- President           
Chandra Bhandari- general secretary 
Dhanraj Gurung- President        
Bishwa Prakash Sharma- General Secretary
Govind Bhattrai- President       
Umesh Jang Raymajhi- general Secretary 
Bishwa Prakash Sharma- President   
Yadav Pandit- General secretary    
Gururaj Ghimire - President        
Gagan Thapa - General secretary 
Kishor Singh Rathour- President    
Kiran Paudel- General secretary  
Keshav Singh- President           
Bashudev Koirala- General secretary  
Mahendra Sharma- President        
Gajendra Karki- General secretary 
Dipak Adhikari- Vice President
Pradip Paudel- President          
Manojmani Acharya- general Secretary      
Pratima Gautam- General secretary
Kalyan Gurung- President          
Jeetjang Basnet- General secretary  
Ranjeet Karna- President
Nain Singh Mahar-President        
Kundan Raj Kafle - General Secretary                
Saroj Kumar Thapa- General Secretary                         
Aanand Raj Tripathi- General secretary(nominated)
Rajeev Dhungana(2020-01-30)- President     
Baldev Timalsina - General secretar
Yubaraj Pandey - General secretary
Deepak Bhattarai -General secretary 
Urmila Thapaliya -General secretary                      
Manoj Baidya -    General secretary                             
Maheshwori Kunwar- General secretary

Ideologies

Freedom

Nationality
B.P Koirala has said, “Country and Nation is not that geography or territory rather nationality is the word which targets to the spirit of collective people”. Nationality is a feeling which is emerged spontaneously to let out the any kind of crisis. There are three significant factors under that definition.

a) Universality b) The trial to solve it and c) the unification of emotion emerged through the trial.

Nepal Student Union has always been to save the sovereignty and self-existence of people. To solve the critical problems of country, to have saved the essence of Nepali, to protect the self-pride of being Nepali and to develop the feelings of “I am Nepali”. NSU has regarded the nationality, which cannot be strengthened without democracy.

Democracy
Democracy is the government of the people, for the people and by the people. NSU has a belief on democracy. In democracy people become free in terms of speaking, information, freedom to conduct mass meetings and all kinds of fundamental rights have been secured.

Democracy does not believe in threatens and challenges to modify the people's concept of politics. It is also an alternative form of secrete voting rights of the people as their own wish. It regards the election system as the best system of selecting the participants of the people. The elected members of the people govern the government. There is also the respect for the less majority group. There is also the right to call back the public participants if they do fake activities before the people. To conduct the election on fix time and compose the government to establish the all system of country. To change the government peacefully, only the democracy is essential. The elected member of people can make the law in democracy.

Socialism

Liberty

Human Rights

Student Unity

See also
Sher Bahadur Deuba
Bimalendra Nidhi
Bishweshwar Prasad Koirala

References

Nepali Congress
Socialism in Nepal
Student organizations established in 1970
Student wings of political parties in Nepal